Trevor Crosby Gaskins (born November 24, 1989) is a Panamanian professional basketball player for Ciclista Olímpico of the Argentine Liga Nacional de Básquet.

He represented the Panama's national basketball team at the 2015 FIBA COCABA Championship in San José, Costa Rica, where he was the tournament's second best scorer and helped secure the gold medal.

On February 27, 2018, Gaskins signed with the Israeli team Maccabi Haifa for the rest of the season, joining his former college teammates Zach Graham and Reginald Buckner. Five days later, he made his debut in an 82–77 win over Hapoel Tel Aviv, scoring 17 points off the bench.

The Basketball Tournament

In 2017, Gaskins played for Ole Hotty Toddy of The Basketball Tournament. Gaskins' team was upset in the first round of the tournament by team NC Prodigal Sons. The Basketball Tournament is an annual $2 million winner-take-all tournament broadcast on ESPN.

References

External links
 RealGM profile
 FIBA profile
 ESPN profile
 Latinbasket.com profile
 Louisiana Tech Bulldogs bio

1989 births
Living people
American expatriate basketball people in Argentina
American expatriate basketball people in Israel
American men's basketball players
Basketball players from Columbia, South Carolina
Ciclista Olímpico players
Ferro Carril Oeste basketball players
Louisiana Tech Bulldogs basketball players
Maccabi Haifa B.C. players
Ole Miss Rebels men's basketball players
Panamanian men's basketball players
Point guards
Shooting guards